Wenonah Park is the central park of Bay County, Michigan. Across the river is another city park, Veterans Memorial Park.

History 
Wenonah Park was established in 1908 as a part of the construction of the adjacent Wenonah Hotel (the site is now occupied by a DoubleTree by Hilton), giving the hotel a clear view of the riverfront. Both the hotel and park opened on November 9, 1908. Full development of the park and construction of the auditorium began after the hotel opening. It was contingent upon the citizens of Bay City approving  in bonds for the purchase of two blocks along the Saginaw River, the removal of buildings, and conversion of the sites into a public park. The Lumbermen's State Bank assumed control of the bonds and credited the Wenonah Park fund on May 18, 1908 with the value of the bonds.

Features 
Wenonah Park is centered on an amphitheatre known as The World Friendship Shell. It is decorated with a large oval sculpture and water fountain. There is a boat dock along the seawall designed to accommodate watercraft of various sizes.

Events 
A number of community events are held at Wenonah Park, such as concerts, arts performances, the Bay City Fireworks Festival, and the Festival of Lights in November.

See also 

 Veterans Memorial Bridge (Bay City, Michigan)
 Wenona Beach Amusement Park

References

External links 
 

Parks in Michigan
Saginaw River
Tourist attractions in Bay County, Michigan
1908 establishments in Michigan